The women's pole vault at the 2010 European Athletics Championships was held at the Estadi Olímpic Lluís Companys on 28 and 30 July.

Medalists

Records

Schedule

Results

Qualification
Qualification: Qualification Performance 4.40 (Q) or at least 12 best performers advance to the final

Final

References
 Qualification Results
 Final Results

Pole vault
Pole vault at the European Athletics Championships
2010 in women's athletics